Ola I Tipota (Greek: Όλα Ή Τίποτα; English: All or nothing) is the fifth studio album by Greek singer-songwriter and record producer Nikos Karvelas, released by CBS Records Greece in June 1987. The album was certified platinum with sales of 100,000 copies. In 1996, a remastered version of the album was released.

Track listing 

1987 albums
Albums produced by Nikos Karvelas
Greek-language albums
Nikos Karvelas albums
Sony Music Greece albums